Maryland is a state located in the Southern United States. According to the 2020 United States Census, Maryland is the 18th most populous state with  inhabitants and the 9th smallest by land area spanning  of land. The state is divided into 23 counties and contains 157 municipalities consisting of cities, towns, or villages. As Maryland does not have minor civil divisions such as townships, areas outside of municipalities have no government below the county level.

Municipalities in Maryland—except Baltimore, which was chartered by the state Constitution—are self-governing municipalities chartered as cities, towns, or villages by an Act of the Maryland General Assembly or, in some cases, by a referendum. Municipalities are the lowest tier administrative units in the state, and all except Baltimore are also subject to county administration. Despite the designations of city, town, or village, there are no differences in municipal power and authority. There is no official classification of municipal governments and the municipalities are equal under state law. The municipalities themselves decide whether to avail themselves of the specific powers conferred on them by the Maryland Constitution and state code. Since its separation from Baltimore County in 1851, the City of Baltimore functions more as a county than a city under state law since it exercises charter home rule, which empowers the city with broad legislative authority similar to Maryland's six home rule counties.

The largest municipality by population in Maryland is Baltimore, an independent city, with 585,708 residents, and the smallest municipality by population is Port Tobacco Village with 18 residents. Many of Maryland's largest population centers (usually suburbs, such as Columbia, Germantown, Silver Spring, Waldorf, Glen Burnie, Ellicott City, Dundalk and Bethesda) are unincorporated census designated places.

List of municipalities

See also
List of census-designated places in Maryland
List of counties in Maryland
Maryland Municipal League

Notes

References

External links

Local government: Municipalities. (2007). Maryland Manual On-Line. State of Maryland Archives. Retrieved on August 7, 2016.

 

Maryland
Maryland
Maryland
Maryland geography-related lists